Karol Rzepecki (21 June 1865 in Poznań – 14 December 1931 in Poznań) was a Polish bookseller, social and political activist, editor of Sokół (Falcon) magazine.

References

 Witold Jakóbczyk, Przetrwać na Wartą 1815-1914, Dzieje narodu i państwa polskiego, vol. III-55, Krajowa Agencja Wydawnicza, Warszawa 1989.

1865 births
1931 deaths
Businesspeople from Poznań
People from the Province of Posen
National-Democratic Party (Poland) politicians
Popular National Union politicians
National Party (Poland) politicians
Members of the Sejm of the Republic of Poland
Members of the Polish Gymnastic Society "Sokół"